The Avenue des Champs-Élysées is a world famous boulevard in the 8th arrondissement of Paris.

Champs-Élysées may also refer to:
 Champs Elysees (horse) (foaled 2003 in England), a Thoroughbred racehorse
 Champs-Élysées–Clemenceau (Paris Métro), an underground railway station in the 8th arrondissement of Paris
 Champs-Élysées Film Festival, held annually in Paris
 Champs-Élysées stage in the Tour de France, since 1975 the final stage of that bicycle stage race, finishing with several circuits of the Avenue des Champs-Élysées
 Jardin des Champs-Élysées, a public park located in the 8th arrondissement of Paris
 Le Roi des Champs-Élysées, a 1934 French comedy film starring Buster Keaton
 "Les Champs-Élysées", a 1969 song by Joe Dassin
 Orchestre des Champs-Élysées, an orchestra which specialises in classical music from about 1750 to the early twentieth century using instruments of the time
 , an administrative district in the 8th arrondissement of Paris
 Théâtre des Champs-Élysées, a theatre located in Quartier des Champs-Élysées, Paris
 Champs Elysées (album), a 2000 album by French producer Bob Sinclar

See also